Leandro Pitarelli de Araújo (born 22 February 1993 in Lucélia, São Paulo) is a Brazilian sprinter.

Career
He won the gold medal in the 400 metres at the 2010 South American Youth Championships in Athletics in Santiago, Chile. He also competed in the 400 metres at the 2010 Summer Youth Olympics, finishing fifth.

Achievements

References

External links
 

1993 births
Living people
Brazilian male sprinters
Athletes (track and field) at the 2010 Summer Youth Olympics
Sportspeople from São Paulo (state)
20th-century Brazilian people
21st-century Brazilian people